Headin' Westward is a 1929 American silent Western film directed by J.P. McGowan and starring Bob Custer, Mary Mayberry and John Lowell.

Cast
 Bob Custer as Oklahoma Adams
 Mary Mayberry as Mary Benson
 John Lowell as Ed Benson
 J.P. McGowan as Sneezer Clark
 Slim Whitaker as Buck McGrath 
 Mack V. Wright as Slim McGee
 Cliff Lyons as Pat Carle
 Dorothy Vernon as Lizzie

References

External links
 

1929 films
1929 Western (genre) films
American black-and-white films
Films directed by J. P. McGowan
Silent American Western (genre) films
1920s English-language films
1920s American films